There are two types of paper umbrella:
 Oil-paper umbrella, for covering a person
 Cocktail umbrella, for decorating drinks